Oyorokoto is a fishing settlement located on Andoni Island in Andoni Local Government Area of Rivers State, Nigeria, and is often referred to as the largest fishing settlement in West Africa sub region. It is the location of major fishing activities in Rivers State, and also the home of many endangered species. Different species of sea turtle and  dolphin are often by-caught by fishermen here. A large dolphin which attracted the attention of both local and international conservation groups was caught by a fisherman at Oyorokoto in the year 2020  

The Nigerian Conservation Foundation in collaboration with an indigenous non-governmental organization, Save Andoni Forest Elephants Initiative (Safe-i), have started the process of sensitization and awareness campaign among fishermen in Oyorokoto to preserve endangered marine species in Andoni Local Government Area. Oyorokoto also part of the proposed Andoni Elephant Sanctuary and Marine national park .

Oyorokoto Atlantic beach 
Oyorokoto features one of the longest sand beaches in Nigeria suitable for holiday makers and eco-tourism.

References 

Populated coastal places in Rivers State